Favites halicora is a species of coral belonging to the family Merulinidae. The species was first described in 1834 by Christian Gottfried Ehrenberg as Astraea halicora.

The species is found in Indian and Pacific Ocean.

References

Merulinidae
Cnidarians of the Pacific Ocean
Cnidarians of the Indian Ocean
Corals described in 1834
Taxa named by Christian Gottfried Ehrenberg